Mildred Gordon may refer to:
 Mildred Gordon (politician) (1923–2016), British Labour Party Member of Parliament
 Mildred Gordon (writer) (1912–1979), American crime fiction novelist
 Mildred Gordon (Ganas) (1922–2015), founder of Ganas community, FFL, GROW
 Mildred Gordon (biologist) (1920–1993), American microbiologist